Kentropyx viridistriga, the green kentropyx, is a species of teiid lizard found in Argentina, Brazil, and Bolivia.

References

viridistriga
Reptiles described in 1894
Taxa named by George Albert Boulenger